Felix Keisinger (born 29 December 1997) is a German Skeleton racer who finished fourth in the standings in the men's singles category of the 2019-20 Skeleton World Cup.

Keisinger is also double Skeleton junior world championships gold medalist having triumphed in that contest in 2019 in Königssee and in 2020 at Winterberg.

During the 2020-21 Skeleton World Cup Keisinger tied for silver with Martins Dukurs of Latvia in the second race of the season at Siguda in Latvia.

World Cup results
All results are sourced from the International Bobsleigh and Skeleton Federation (IBSF).

References

External links

 
 Felix Keisinger at the Bob und Schlittenverband Deutschland 

1997 births
Living people
German male skeleton racers
21st-century German people